Neoascia tuberculifera is a species of hoverfly in the family Syrphidae.

Distribution
Russia.

References

Eristalinae
Insects described in 1957
Diptera of Asia